Leishmania aethiopica is a Leishmania species.

It is associated with cutaneous leishmaniasis also called "oriental sore". It comes under the old world group of Leishmania species, along with L. major and L. tropica which are other agents causing oriental sore.

References

Parasitic excavates
Trypanosomatida